Sameer Verma (born 22 October 1994) is an Indian badminton player. He trains at the Gopichand Badminton Academy, Hyderabad. Sameer is the brother of Indian badminton player Sourabh Verma.

Career

2011 
Verma won a silver medal in the Asian Junior Championships, held in Lucknow, India and a bronze medal in mixed team event. He also won silver at the men's singles at the 2011 Commonwealth Youth Games, losing in the final to Zulfadli Zulkiffli of Malaysia. He also secured a bronze medal in World Junior Championships in the boys' singles category.

2012 
At the 36th Junior National Badminton Championships in Jaipur, Verma won the boys' singles U-19 category. The same year Verma also reached the final of the Iran Fajr International. He also secured a bronze medal in Asian Junior Championships held in Gimcheon, South Korea in the boys' singles category. He had a world rank #3 in Junior boys' singles.

2013 
In 2013, Verma won his first international titles when he won the men's singles event at the Bahrain International Series and Bahrain International Challenge.

2014 
Battling injuries in 2012 and 2013, Verma came back strongly in 2014 by winning the All India Senior Ranking Badminton Championships, in Bareilly. He also bagged the Bahrain International Challenge title defeating Subhankar Dey in a thrilling three setter finals. He also added another title to his name by won the Bahrain International Series against Dinuka Karunaratne in a 1-hour three setter match.

2015 
Verma grabbed three major titles in the men's singles category including Tata Open International Challenge held at Mumbai, India, Bahrain International Challenge and Bahrain International Series. He also finished as runner-up in the Bangladesh and Sri Lanka International Challenge. Last but not the least, he also a semi finalist in the Bulgaria International Challenge tournament.

2016 
Verma defeated world No. 3 Jan Ø. Jørgensen in straight games to storm into the final of the Hong Kong Open Super Series. In the final, he lost to host player, Ng Ka Long, in straight games.

2017 
Verma won the Syed Modi International in January 2017 defeating B. Sai Praneeth 21–19 21–16 in the final. He beat the higher ranked Hans-Kristian Vittinghus in the quarter finals of the same tournament.

2018 
In 2018, Verma won the Swiss Open title beating Jan Ø. Jørgensen (21–15, 21–13) in the final. Later in the year he also won the Hyderabad Open a Super 100 event, before defending his title in November beating Lu Guangzu by 16–21, 21–19, 21–14 at the Syed Modi International. With his title finish at his home Super 300 event, he confirmed his qualification for the World Tour Finals, in Guangzhou, standing at the 7th position in the qualification list and where only the top 8 most consistent players across all five disciplines are allowed to compete for the year end finale crown and win a share of $1.5 million. He played the semi-finals of the World Tour Finals as the first Indian male badminton player to secure a position in the World Tour Finals tournament. He stunned Tommy Sugiarto and Kantaphon Wangcharoen in straight sets in the group stage. Verma lost the hard-fought semi-finals against Shi Yuqi of China after leading on match-point in the second set. The thrilling match lasted for an hour and eight minutes, the scores being 21–12, 20–22 and 17–21.

Achievements

World Junior Championships 
Boys' singles

Asian Junior Championships 
Boys' singles

BWF World Tour (3 titles) 
The BWF World Tour, which was announced on 19 March 2017 and implemented in 2018, is a series of elite badminton tournaments sanctioned by the Badminton World Federation (BWF). The BWF World Tours are divided into levels of World Tour Finals, Super 1000, Super 750, Super 500, Super 300 (part of the HSBC World Tour), and the BWF Tour Super 100.

Men's singles

BWF Superseries (1 runner-up) 
The BWF Superseries, which was launched on 14 December 2006 and implemented in 2007, was a series of elite badminton tournaments, sanctioned by the Badminton World Federation (BWF). BWF Superseries levels were Superseries and Superseries Premier. A season of Superseries consisted of twelve tournaments around the world that had been introduced since 2011. Successful players were invited to the Superseries Finals, which were held at the end of each year.

Men's singles

  BWF Superseries Finals tournament
  BWF Superseries Premier tournament
  BWF Superseries tournament

BWF Grand Prix (1 title) 
The BWF Grand Prix had two levels, the Grand Prix and Grand Prix Gold. It was a series of badminton tournaments sanctioned by the Badminton World Federation (BWF) and played between 2007 and 2017.

Men's singles

  BWF Grand Prix Gold tournament
  BWF Grand Prix tournament

BWF International Challenge/Series (5 titles, 3 runners-up) 
Men's singles

  BWF International Challenge tournament
  BWF International Series tournament
  BWF Future Series tournament

Personal 
Verma hails from a sport-loving family. His parents live in Dhar district in Madhya Pradesh. He followed in the footsteps of his brother Sourabh Varma, who is also an internationally ranked badminton player, and took up badminton as a sport at a very young age. He soon moved to the Gopichand Badminton Academy in Hyderabad to train under coach and former Indian player Pullela Gopichand. Sameer Verma has been an inspiration for the young badminton players as he has depicted good ethics and hardworking values for the upcoming players in the field.

Awards 
He has been awarded the Vikram Award in the year 2016 for badminton by Madhya Pradesh. He has also been the recipient for the Eklavya Award in 2009 for badminton by Madhya Pradesh. Additionally, Sameer Verma has been nominated for the Sportsman of the Year in Racquet Sport (2018) at the Sportstar Aces Awards supported by Supreme Committee of Delivery and Legacy and Emerging Sportsman of the Year by Indian Sports Honors (2017), Organised by Virat Kohli Foundation.

References 

1994 births
Living people
People from Madhya Pradesh
Indian male badminton players
Badminton players at the 2018 Asian Games
Asian Games competitors for India